Sir William Thompson or Thomson may refer to:
 Sir William Thompson (1614–1681) (1614–1681), of London, English businessman and politician
 Sir William Thompson (Ipswich MP) (1678–1739), of Middle Temple, an English judge and Whig politician
 William Thomson, 1st Baron Kelvin (1824–1907), British mathematical physicist and engineer
 Sir William Thompson (physician) (1861–1929), Irish physician